Cyril Hilsum  (born 17 May 1925) is a British physicist and academic.

Hilsum was elected a member of the National Academy of Engineering in 1983 for the inventiveness and leadership in introducing III-V semiconductors into electronic technology.

Life
Hilsum entered Raine's Foundation School in 1936 as the middle of three brothers, leaving in 1943 after being accepted into University College London, where he did his BSc. In 1945, he joined the Royal Naval Scientific Service, moving in 1947 to the Admiralty Research Laboratory. In 1950, he transferred again to the Services Electronics Research Laboratory (SERL) where he remained until 1964 before again moving, this time to the Royal Radar Establishment. He won the Welker Award in 1978, was elected a Fellow of the Royal Academy of Engineering, a Fellow of the Royal Society in 1979 and an honorary member of the American National Academy of Engineering. In 1983, he was appointed Chief Scientist at GEC Hirst Research Centre. He was awarded the Max Born Prize in 1987, the 1988 Faraday Medal, and from then until 1990 served as President of the Institute of Physics. In the 1990 Queen's Birthday Honours, he was appointed a Commander of the Order of the British Empire (CBE) for "services to the Electrical and Electronics Industry". He was the subject of a photograph by Nick Sinclair in 1993 that is currently held by the National Portrait Gallery. In 1997, he was awarded the Glazebrook Medal and Prize from the Institute of Physics, and is notable as the only scientist to hold both this and the Faraday Medal together. He has served as a corporate research advisor for various entities, including Cambridge Display Technology, the European Commission and Unilever. In 2007, he was awarded the Royal Society's Royal Medal 'for his many outstanding contributions and for continuing to use his prodigious talents on behalf of industry, government and academe to this day'.

Hilsum serves as chairman of the scientific board for Peratech and is a visiting professor of physics at UCL, as well as sitting on the Defence Scientific Advisory Council. He also endorses the Karen Burt Memorial Award, named after his daughter, which is awarded yearly by the Women's Engineering Society 'to a woman engineer of high calibre who has newly attained full corporate membership and Chartered Engineer status through her relevant professional Institution and who has contributed to the promotion of the engineering profession'. In 2006, he was made a Fellow of the ESSCIRC, and in 2007 wrote an obituary for Gareth Roberts for The Guardian and the Royal Society.

Research
While working for the Ministry of Defence, Hilsum helped develop commercial applications for gallium arsenide, and was responsible for creating the UK's first semiconductor laser. He was one of the developers of the 
Ridley-Watkins-Hilsum theory that provided the theoretical basis of the Gunn diode, and his research helped form the basis of modern LCD technology, bringing in over £100m to the UK government. The British Liquid Crystal Society awards a Cyril Hilsum Medal each year "to British candidates for overall contributions to liquid-crystal science and technology. The award is made to mid-career scientists who have made notable contributions to the subject over a number of years."

Personal life
He married Betty Hilsum, with whom he had two daughters, Lindsey, a correspondent for Channel 4 and Karen Burt, an engineer who died in 1997 and has a Women's Engineering Society memorial award named after her.

Works
 Semiconducting III-V Compounds (Monographs on Semiconductors), C. Hilsum, 239 pages, Publ. Elsevier (1961), 
 Liquid Crystals, C. Hilsum, Cambridge Univ Press (1985), 
 Device Physics (Vol 4 of Handbook on Semiconductors), C. Hilsum and T.S. Moss (Editors), 1244 pages, Publ. JAI Press (1993) 
 Communications After AD2000, C. Hilsum, D.E.N. Davies, A.W. Rudge (Editors), Chapman & Hall, (1993),

References

External links

1925 births
Living people
English physicists
Semiconductor physicists
Fellow Members of the IEEE
Fellows of the Royal Society
Fellows of the Royal Academy of Engineering
Commanders of the Order of the British Empire
Alumni of University College London
Royal Medal winners
Presidents of the Institute of Physics
People educated at Raine's Foundation School
General Electric Company
Royal Navy personnel of World War II